Peter Raper (22 April 1929 – 23 December 1999) was an Australian rower. He competed in the men's coxless pair event at the 1956 Summer Olympics.

References

1929 births
1999 deaths
Australian male rowers
Olympic rowers of Australia
Rowers at the 1956 Summer Olympics
Place of birth missing
20th-century Australian people